Dillo is a district of Borena Zone in the Oromia Region of Ethiopia.

, the population was estimated at 43,853 (21,543 female and 22,310 male) with 97% rural and 3% urban. The dominant climate condition is arid and the population relies on hand-dug shallow wells and ponds for water sources. The residents engage in livestock production, predominantly cattle, sheep and goats, but also equines, camel and poultry.

References 

Districts of Oromia Region